Carcinopyga is a genus of tiger moths in the family Erebidae. The genus was described by Felder in 1874.

Species
Carcinopyga gurkoi Kautt & Saldaitis, 1997
Carcinopyga lichenigera C. Felder & R. Felder, 1874
Carcinopyga proserpina (Staudinger, 1887)

References

  1986: Carcinopyga lindti spec. nov. (Lepidoptera, Arctiidae) aus Tian Schan. Neue Entomologische Nachrichten 19 (1/2): 31–36.
 , 1874 in Felder & Rogenhofer, Reise öst. Fregatta Novara (Zool.) 2 (Abt. 2): pl. 101, f. 3.

External links

Callimorphina
Moth genera